The Buddhist path (marga) to liberation, also referred to as awakening, is described in a wide variety of ways. The classical one is the Noble Eightfold Path, which is only one of several summaries presented in the Sutta Pitaka. A number of other paths to liberation exist within various Buddhist traditions and theology.

Early Buddhism

There are various expositions of the path to liberation in the Early Buddhist texts, the following examples are drawn from the Pali Nikayas.

The Noble Eightfold Path

The Noble Eightfold Path is widely known as the description of the Buddhist path. In the Sutta Pitaka it is summed up as follows:

Alternate sequences in the Pali Nikayas
Alternate, and possibly older, sequences of the stages on the Buddhist path to liberation, can be found throughout the Pali Canon.

Tevijja Sutta
A standard sequence of developments can be found in the Nikayas, which may predate the more stylised four noble truths. For example the Tevijja Sutta verse 40–75 (Dikha Nikaya 13):
 Verse 40: A Tathàgata is born into the world, who makes his knowledge known to others. 
 Verse 41: A householder listens to that truth, acquires faith, and goes forth from the household life into the homeless state.
 Verse 42: He passes a life self-restrained, good in his conduct, guarding the door of his senses; mindful and self-possessed.
 Verse 43–75: This results in:
 The confidence of heart that results from the sense of goodness.
 The way in which he guards the doors of his senses.
 The way in which he is mindful and self-possessed.
 His habit of being content with little, of adopting simplicity of life.
 His conquest of the five hindrances, each with the explanatory simile.
 The joy and peace which, as a result of this conquest, fills his whole being.

Cula-Hatthipadopama-sutta
According to Rod Bucknell, another listing of path stages occurs in various places in the Majjhima Nikaya, and can be illustrated with the following list of stages from the Cula-Hatthipadopama-sutta (Lesser Discourse on the Simile of the Elephant's Footprints).

 Dhamma / saddha/ pabbajja: A layman hears a Buddha teach the Dhamma, comes to have faith in him, and decides to take ordination as a monk.
 Sila: He adopts the moral precepts.
 Indriyasamvara (element of right effort): He practises "guarding the six sense-doors."
 Sati-sampajanna: He practises mindfulness and self-possession (actually described as mindfulness of the body, kayanussati).
Jhana 1: He finds an isolated spot in which to meditate, purifies his mind of the hindrances (nivarana), and attains the first rupa-jhana.
 Jhana 2: He attains the second jhana. 
 Jhana 3: He attains the third jhana. 
 Jhana 4: He attains the fourth jhana. 
 Pubbenivasanussati-ñana: He recollects his many former existences in samsara.
 Sattanam cutupapata-ñana: He observes the death and rebirth of beings according to their karmas. 
 Asavakkhaya-ñana: He brings about the destruction of the asavas (cankers), and attains a profound realization of (as opposed to mere knowledge about) the Four Noble Truths.
 Vimutti: He perceives that he is now liberated, that he has done what was to be done.

Maha-Assapura-sutta 
According to Bucknell, in this sutta the Buddha gives the following list of "things that are to be done by recluses and brahmans":
 hiri-ottappa: The recluse or brahman cultivates a sense of shame and fear of blame. 
 parisuddha kaya-samacara – He cultivates pure conduct of body. 
 parisuddha vaci-samacara: He cultivates pure conduct of speech. 
 parisuddha mano-samacara: He cultivates pure conduct of mind. 
 parisuddha ajiva: He cultivates pure livelihood. 
 indriyasamvara: He guards the six sense-doors. 
 bhojane mattaññuta: He exercises restraint in eating. 
 jagariya: He practises wakefulness.
 Sati-sampajanna: He is mindful and self-possessed. 
 First Jhana
 Second Jhana
 Third Jhana
 Fourth Jhana
 Pubbenivasanussati-ñana: He recollects his former existences. 
 Sattanam cutupapata-ñana: He observes the death and rebirth of beings. 
 Asavakkhaya-ñana – Vimutti: He destroys the asavas, realizes the four noble truths, and perceives that he is liberated

Sekha-sutta 
According to Bucknell, in the Sekha sutta the Buddha prompts Ananda to teach a "learner's course" to a group of disciples, which goes thus:
 sila
 indriyasamvara
 bhojane mattaññuta, restraint in eating. 
 jagariya, wakefulness.
 satta saddhamma: He develops the seven "excellent qualities" (saddha, hiri, ottappa, bahussuta, viriya, sati, pañña – faith, sense of shame, fear of blame, hearing much, energy, mindfulness, insight) 
 jhana: He attains without difficulty the four jhanas. 
 Pubbenivasanussati-ñana: He recollects his former existences. 
 Sattanam cutupapata-ñana: He observes the death and rebirth of beings. 
 Asavakkhaya-ñana – Vimutti: He destroys the asavas and perceives that he is liberated.

Various sequences in the Madhyama Agama 
According to Bhikkhu Sujato, the Chinese Madhyama Agama of the Sarvastivada school includes some exposition of the gradual path not available in the Pali Nikayas of the Theravada school. He outlines three main such expositions of the path, from the following sutras, MA 44, MA 54, and MA 55:

MA 44

MA 54

MA 55

Bodhipakkhiyādhammā

The Noble Eightfold Path is one of the lists in the bodhipakkhiyā dhammā, a term used in the Pali commentaries to refer to seven sets of qualities or aids to awakening regularly ascribed the Buddha throughout the Pali Canon, each summarizing the Buddhist path. Within these seven sets of awakening qualities, there is a total of thirty-seven overlapping and repetitive factors or qualities.

Four establishments of mindfulness (cattāro satipaṭṭhānā)
 Mindfulness of the body (kāyānupassanā, S. kayānupasthāna)
 Mindfulness of feelings (vedanānupassanā, S. vedanānupasthāna)
 Mindfulness of mental states (cittānupassanā, S. cittanupasthāna)
 Mindfulness of mental qualities (dhammānupassanā, S. dharmanupasthāna)

Four right exertions/efforts (cattāro sammappadhānā)
 Exertion for the preventing of unskillful states to arise
 Exertion for the abandoning of the already arisen unskillful states
 Exertion for the arising of skillful states
 Exertion for the sustaining and increasing of arisen skillful states

Four bases of magical/mental/supernatural power (cattāro iddhipādā)
 Will (chanda, S. chanda)
 Energy, effort (viriya, S. vīrya)
 Consciousness (citta, S. citta)

Five spiritual faculties (pañca indriya)
 Conviction (saddhā, S. śraddhā)
 Energy, effort (viriya, s. vīrya)
 Mindfulness (sati, S. smṛti)
 Unification (samādhi, S. samādhi)
 Wisdom (paññā, S. prajñā)

Five Strengths (pañca bala)
 Conviction (saddhā, S. śraddhā)
 Energy, effort (viriya, S. vīrya)
 Mindfulness (Sati_(Buddhism), S. smṛti)
 Unification (samādhi, S. samādhi)
 Wisdom (paññā, S. prajñā)

Seven Factors of Awakening (bojjhanga)
 Mindfulness (sati, S. smṛti)
 Investigation (dhamma vicaya, S. dharmapravicaya)
 Energy, effort (viriya, S. vīrya)
 Joy (pīti, S. prīti)
 Tranquillity (passaddhi, S. praśrabdhi)
 Unification (samādhi, S. samādhi)
 Equanimity (upekkhā, S. upekṣā)

Noble Eightfold Path
 Right Understanding (sammā diṭṭhi, S. samyag-dṛṣṭi)
 Right Intention (sammā saṅkappa, S. samyak-saṃkalpa)
 Right Speech (sammā vācā, S. samyag-vāc)
 Right Action (sammā kammanta, S. samyak-karmānta)
 Right Livelihood (sammā ājīva, S. samyag-ājīva)
 Right Effort (sammā vāyāma, S. samyag-vyāyāma)
 Right Mindfulness (sammā sati, S. samyak-smṛti)
 Right Unification (sammā samādhi, S. samyak-samādhi)

Developing the seven factors of awakening
According to Rupert Gethin, the Buddhist path to awakening is frequently summarized in the Pali Canon in a short formula as 

Various practices lead to the development of the bojjhaṅgā, the seven factors of awakening, which are not only the means to, but also the constituents of awakening. Together with satipatthana (mindfulness) and anapanasati (breath-meditation), this results in a "heightened awareness," "overcoming distracting and disturbing emotions."

Alternate formulations
Other descriptions of Buddhist essentials can also be found.

Anupubbikathā
Another formula is anupubbikathā, "graduated talk, in which the Buddha talks on generosity (dāna), virtue (sīla), heaven (sagga), danger of sensual pleasure ( ādīnava) and renunciation (nekkhamma). When the listener is prepared by these topics, the Buddha then delivers "the teaching special to the Buddhas,"
the Four Noble Truths (cattāri ariya-saccāni), by which arises "the spotless immaculate vision of the Dhamma." In the Tibetan Lamrim teachings, the Bodhisattva-path, with its training of the six perfections, is added to this formula.

Atthakavagga
The Atthakavagga, one of the oldest books of the Sutta Pitaka, contained in the Sutta Nipata, does not give a clear-cut goal such as Nirvana, but describes the ideal person. This ideal person is especially characterized by suddhi (purity) and santi (calmness).

Commentaries on the Atthakavagga, namely the Mahaniddesa and the commentary by Buddhaghosa, show the development of Buddhist ideas over time. Both commentaries place the Atthakavagga in their frame of reference, giving an elaborated system of thought far more complicated than the Atthakavagga itself.

Theravada tradition - Path of purification

The classical outline of the Theravada path to liberation are the Seven Purifications, as described by Buddhaghosa in the Visuddhimagga. These purifications are:
 Purification of Conduct (sīla-visuddhi)
 Purification of Mind (citta-visuddhi)
 Purification of View (ditthi-visuddhi)
 Purification by Overcoming Doubt (kankha-vitarana-visuddhi)
 Purification by Knowledge and Vision of What Is Path and Not Path (maggamagga-ñanadassana-visuddhi)
 Purification by Knowledge and Vision of the Course of Practice (patipada-ñanadassana-visuddhi)
 Knowledge of contemplation of rise and fall (udayabbayanupassana-nana)
 Knowledge of contemplation of dissolution (bhanganupassana-nana)
 Knowledge of appearance as terror (bhayatupatthana-nana)
 Knowledge of contemplation of danger (adinavanupassana-nana)
 Knowledge of contemplation of dispassion (nibbidanupassana-nana)
 Knowledge of desire for deliverance (muncitukamyata-nana)
 Knowledge of contemplation of reflection (patisankhanupassana-nana)
 Knowledge of equanimity about formations (sankharupekka-nana)
 Conformity knowledge (anuloma-nana)
 Purification by Knowledge and Vision (ñanadassana-visuddhi)
 Change of lineage
 The first path and fruit
 The second path and fruit
 The third path and fruit
 The fourth path and fruit

The "Purification by Knowledge and Vision" is the culmination of the practice, in four stages leading to liberation.

The emphasis in this system is on understanding the three marks of existence, dukkha, anatta, anicca. This emphasis is recognizable in the value that is given to vipassana over samatha, especially in the contemporary vipassana movement.

Sarvastivada tradition 
The Sarvāstivāda Vaibhāṣika school developed an influential outline of the path to awakening, one which was later adapted and modified by the scholars of the Mahayana tradition. This was called the "five paths" (pañcamārga), and can be seen in their Abhidharma texts as well as Vasubadhu's Abhidharmakośa (AKBh).

The five paths are:

 Mokṣa-bhāgīya (The state leading up to release) or Saṃbhāra-mārga (path of accumulation). According to Vasubandhu, this entails morality, learning the teaching and the practice of the four foundations of mindfulness. 
 Nirveda-bhāgīya (The state leading up to penetration) or Prayoga-mārga (The path of preparation). Vasubandhu's AKBh says that here one observes the four noble truths in terms of its sixteen aspects. 
 Darśana-mārga (The path of seeing or insight). According to the AKBh, in this path one continues to observe the four noble truths until one realizes it and abandons eighty eight afflictions (kleshas). 
 Bhāvanā-mārga, (The path of cultivation). According to the AKBh, in this stage, one continues to practice and abandons 10 further kleshas. 
 Aśaikṣā-mārga (The path of no more learning or consummation). One is fully freed of all obstructions and afflictions and are thus perfected or fulfilled (niṣṭhā).

Bodhisattva path

Mahāyāna Buddhism is based principally upon the path of a bodhisattva. Mahāyāna Buddhism encourages everyone to become bodhisattvas and to take the bodhisattva vows. With these vows, one makes the promise to work for the complete enlightenment of all sentient beings by following the bodhisattva path. The path can be described in terms of the six perfections or in terms of the five paths and ten bhumis.

Six paramitas

The six paramitas are the means by which Mahayana practitioners actualize their aspiration to attain complete enlightenment for the benefit of all. In Mahāyāna Buddhism, the Prajñapāramitā Sūtras, the Lotus Sutra (Skt., Saddharma Puṇḍarīka Sūtra), and a large number of other texts, list the six perfections as follows:

 Dāna pāramitā: generosity, the attitude of giving
 Śīla pāramitā : virtue, morality, discipline, proper conduct 
  (kshanti) pāramitā : patience, tolerance, forbearance, acceptance, endurance 
 Vīrya pāramitā : energy, diligence, vigor, effort 
 Dhyāna pāramitā : one-pointed concentration, contemplation 
 Prajñā pāramitā : wisdom, insight

Five paths and ten bhumis

Five paths
The Mahayana commentary the Abhisamayalamkara presents a progressive formula of five paths (pañcamārga, Wylie Tibetan lam lnga) adopted from the Sarvastivada tradition's Abhidharma exposition. The Five Paths as taught in the Mahayana are:
The path of accumulation (saṃbhāra-mārga, Wylie Tibetan: tshogs lam). Persons on this Path:
 Possess a strong desire to overcome suffering, either their own or others;
 Renunciate the worldly life.
The path of preparation or application (prayoga-mārga, Wylie Tibetan: sbyor lam). Persons on this Path:
 Start practicing meditation;
 Have analytical knowledge of emptiness.
The path of seeing (darśana-mārga, Wylie Tibetan: mthong lam) (Bhūmi 1). Persons on this Path:
 Practice profound concentration meditation on the nature of reality;
 Realize the emptiness of reality.
 Corresponds to "stream-entry" and the first Bodhisattva Bhumi. 
The path of meditation (bhāvanā-mārga, Wylie Tibetan: sgom lam) (Bhūmi 2–7). Persons on this path purify themselves and accumulate wisdom.
The path of no more learning or consummation (aśaikṣā-mārga, Wylie Tibetan: mi slob pa'I lam or thar phyin pa'i lam) (Bhūmi 8–10). Persons on this Path have completely purified themselves.

Ten Bhumis

The "bodhisattva bhūmis" ("enlightenment-being grounds/levels") are subcategories of the Five Paths. The Sanskrit term bhūmi literally means "ground" or "foundation", since each stage represents a level of attainment and serves as a basis for the next one. Each level marks a definite advancement in one's training that is accompanied by progressively greater power and wisdom. The Avatamsaka Sutra refers to the following ten bhūmis:
 The Very Joyous (Skt. Paramudita), in which one rejoices at realizing a partial aspect of the truth;
 The Stainless (Skt. Vimala), in which one is free from all defilement;
 The Luminous (Skt. Prabhakari), in which one radiates the light of wisdom;
 The Radiant (Skt. Archishmati), in which the radiant flame of wisdom burns away earthly desires;
 The Difficult to Cultivate (Skt. Sudurjaya), in which one surmounts the illusions of darkness, or ignorance as the Middle Way;
 The Manifest (Skt. Abhimukhi) in which supreme wisdom begins to manifest;
 The Gone Afar (Skt. Duramgama), in which one rises above the states of the Two vehicles;
 The Immovable (Skt. Achala), in which one dwells firmly in the truth of the Middle Way and cannot be perturbed by anything;
 The Good Intelligence (Skt. Sadhumati), in which one preaches the Law freely and without restriction;
 The Cloud of Doctrine (Skt. Dharmamegha), in which one benefits all sentient beings with the Law (Dharma), just as a cloud sends down rain impartially on all things.

Tibetan Buddhism

Lam Rim

Lam Rim describes the stages of the path. Tsong Khapa mentions three essential elements:
 The aspiration for awakening
 Bodhicitta, the aspiration to attain this for all living beings
 Insight into emptiness

Annuttara-yoga tantras

In the highest class of tantra, two stages of practice are distinguished, namely generation and completion. In some Buddhist tantras, both stages can be practiced simultaneously, whereas in others, one first actualizes the generation stage before continuing with the completion stage practices.

Generation stage
In the first stage of generation, one engages in deity yoga. One practices oneself in the identification with the meditational Buddha or deity (yidam) by visualisations, until one can meditate single-pointedly on being the deity.

Four purities 
In the generation stage of Deity Yoga, the practitioner visualizes the "Four Purities" (Tibetan: yongs su dag pa bzhi; yongs dag bzhi) which define the principal Tantric methodology of Deity Yoga that distinguishes it from the rest of Buddhism:
 Seeing one's body as the body of the deity
 Seeing one's environment as the pure land or mandala of the deity
 Perceiving one's enjoyments as bliss of the deity, free from attachment
 Performing one's actions only for the benefit of others (bodhichitta motivation, altruism)

Completion stage
In the next stage of completion, the practitioner can use either the path of method (thabs lam) or the path of liberation ('grol lam).

At the path of method the practitioner engages in Kundalini yoga practices. These involve the subtle energy system of the body of the chakras and the energy channels. The "wind energy" is directed and dissolved into the heart chakra, where-after the Mahamudra remains, and the practitioner is physically and mentally transformed.

At the path of liberation the practitioner applies mindfulness, a preparatory practice for Mahamudra or Dzogchen, to realize the inherent emptiness of every-'thing' that exists.

Four yogas of mahāmudrā

Mahāmudrā' literally means "great seal" or "great symbol". The name refers to the way one who has realized mahāmudrā. "Mudra" refers to the fact that each phenomenon appears vividly, and "maha" refers to the fact that it is beyond concept, imagination, and projection.

Mahāmudrā is sometimes divided into four distinct phases known as the four yogas of mahāmudrā. They are as follows:
 One-pointedness;
 Simplicity, "free from complexity" or "not elaborate";
 One taste;
 Non-meditation, the state of not holding to either an object of meditation nor to a meditator. Nothing further needs to be 'meditated upon' or 'cultivated at this stage.

These stages parallel the four yogas of dzogchen semde. The four yogas of Mahāmudrā have also been correlated with the Mahāyāna five Bhumi paths.

Zen
Although the Rinzai Zen-tradition emphasises sudden awakening over the study of scripture, in practice several stages can be distinguished. A well-known example are the Ten Ox-Herding Pictures which detail the steps on the Path.

Two Entrances and Four Practices
The Long Scroll of the Treatise on the Two Entrances and Four Practices, attributed to Bodhidharma, refers the entrance of principle (理入 lǐrù) and the entrance of practice (行入 xíngrù).  
 "Entrance of principle" refers to seeing through the obscurations of our daily mind and manifesting our true nature, that is, Buddha nature; it is referred to in one short passage:

 "Entrance of practice" deals with practicing a "detached perspective on the varying circumstances of one's own life," through different daily practices. In the section on the latter, the four practices are listed as being at the core of Bodhidharma's teaching. These are:
 Practice of the retribution of enmity: to accept all suffering as the fruition of past transgressions, without enmity or complaint.
Practice of the acceptance of circumstances: to remain unmoved even by good fortune, recognizing it as evanescent.
Practice of the absence of craving: to be without craving, which is the source of all suffering.
Practice of accordance with the Dharma: to eradicate wrong thoughts and practice the six perfections, without having any "practice"

According to John R. McRae, "the "entrance of principle" refers to interior cultivation, mental practice undertaken deep within the individual's psyche, and the "entrance of practice" refers to practice undertaken actively and in interaction with the world." Yet, McRae also notes that it's not clear what exactly the "entrance of principle" entailed. The phrase "wall contemplation," biguan, is not explicated. Later tradition graphically depicted it as practicing dhyana while facing a wall, but it may be a metaphor, referring to the four walls of a room which prevent the winds from entering the room.

Sudden and gradual

In the 8th century the distinction became part of a struggle for influence at the Chinese court by Shenhui, a student of Huineng. Hereafter "sudden enlightenment" became one of the hallmarks of Chan Buddhism, though the sharp distinction was softened by subsequent generations of practitioners. Once the dichotomy between sudden and gradual was in place, it defined its own logic and rhetorics, which are also recognizable in the distinction between Caodong (Soto) and Lin-ji (Rinzai) chán. But it also led to a "sometimes bitter and always prolix sectarian controversy between later Chán and Hua-yen exegetes". 

In the Huayan classification of teachings, the sudden approach was regarded inferior to the Perfect Teaching of Hua-yen. Guifeng Zongmi, fifth patriarch of Hua-yen ànd Chán-master, devised his own classification to counter this subordination. Guifeng Zongmi also softened the edge between sudden and gradual. In his analysis, sudden awakening points to seeing into one's true nature, but is to be followed by a gradual cultivation to attain Buddhahood. Chinul, a 12th-century Korean Seon master, followed Zongmi, and also emphasized that insight into our true nature is sudden, but is to be followed by practice to ripen the insight and attain full Buddhahood. To establish the superiority of the Chán-teachings, Chinul explained the sudden approach as not pointing to mere emptiness, but to suchness or the dharmadhatu.

This is also the standpoint of the contemporary Sanbo Kyodan, according to whom kensho is at the start of the path to full  enlightenment. This gradual cultivation is described by Chan Master Sheng Yen as follows:

Rinzai-Zen
In Rinzai, insight into true nature is to be followed by gradual cultivation. This is described in teachings such as The Three mysterious Gates of Linji, and the Four Ways of Knowing of Hakuin.

Sōtō-Zen

Although Sōtō emphasizes shikan-taza, just-sitting, this tradition too had description of development within the practice. This is described by Tozan, who described the Five ranks of enlightenment.

See also
 Four Noble Truths
 Index of Buddhism-related articles
 Mushi-dokugo
 Noble Eightfold Path
 Samatha & Vipassanā
 Secular Buddhism

Notes

References

Sources

Printed sources

Web-sources

External links
Seven Stages of Purification
 Mahasi Sayadaw, The Progress of Insight (Visuddhiñana-katha)
 Ve. Matara Sri Nanarama, The Seven Stages of Purification & The Insight Knowledges

Lam Rim
 Karin Valham, Lam.Rim Outlines

Creation and Completion
 Jamgon Kongtrul Lodrö Thaye, The Essential Points of Creation & Completion, Part 1
 Jamgon Kongtrul Lodrö Thaye, The Essential Points of Creation & Completion, Part 2

Mahamudra
 Mahamudra Meditation Guide

Comparative Buddhism